Binaka Airport is an airport in Gunungsitoli, Nias Island, Indonesia. It is located in Jalan Pelabuhan Udara Binaka km. 19.5 Gunungsitoli. This airport provides domestic flight service.

Airlines and destinations

The following destinations are served from Binaka Airport:

References

Airports in North Sumatra